Alexander James Stewart (born 29 November 1962) is a Scottish Conservative Party politician who has been a Member of the Scottish Parliament (MSP) for the Mid Scotland and Fife region since 2016.

Political career 
Stewart began his political career when he was elected to Perth and Kinross Council as a councillor for Perth City South.

Stewart stood in the 2015 general election as the Scottish Conservative candidate for Perth and North Perthshire, coming second to the Scottish National Party (SNP)'s Pete Wishart, who was returned with a near 10,000 majority.

In the 2016 Scottish Parliament election, Stewart stood as the Scottish Conservative candidate for Clackmannanshire and Dunblane where he came third, then was elected from the Mid Scotland and Fife regional list. Following his election to the Scottish Parliament, he stood down as a councillor at the 2017 Scottish local elections having served in the role for 18 years.

Stewart campaigned for Britain to leave the European Union in the 2016 EU Referendum.

Formerly the Scottish Conservative spokesperson for International Development and External Affairs in the Scottish Parliament; Alexander was promoted to Spokesperson and Shadow Minister for Local Government in June 2017 by Scottish Conservative Party leader Ruth Davidson.

References

External links 
 

1962 births
Living people
Place of birth missing (living people)
People educated at Morrison's Academy
Members of the Order of the British Empire
People from Perth, Scotland
People educated at Craigclowan Preparatory School
Alumni of Glasgow Caledonian University
Alumni of the Open University
British charity and campaign group workers
Conservative MSPs
Members of the Scottish Parliament 2016–2021
Members of the Scottish Parliament 2021–2026
Scottish Conservative Party councillors
Scottish Conservative Party parliamentary candidates